Bodles is a locality in southern Jamaica. Bauxite is found there.

Transport 
A railway was constructed in the 1950s for the export of bauxite.

See also 
 Railway stations in Jamaica
 Transport in Jamaica

References

Populated places in Jamaica